Ernest Christiani (16 April 1915 – 19 March 1961) was a Guyanese cricketer. He played in five first-class matches for British Guiana from 1935 to 1947.

See also
 List of Guyanese representative cricketers

References

External links
 

1915 births
1961 deaths
Guyanese cricketers
Guyana cricketers
Sportspeople from Georgetown, Guyana